Main Intaquam Loonga  is a 1982 Indian Hindi-language action sports film starring Dharmendra, Reena Roy, Nirupa Roy, Amrish Puri. Dharmendra plays a boxer in the film. Footage from this film was used in the 2007 film Apne, also starring Dharmendra as a retired boxer. It is a remake of the 1978 Kannada film Thayige Thakka Maga.

Dharmendra's son Sunny Deol was used as a stand-in for his father where he is shown doing one hand push-ups at the very beginning of the title song. This was before he made his debut as a leading actor in Betaab (1983).

Plot 
Kumar is interested in boxing, but his mother Janki does not want him to become a boxer. He falls in love with his neighbour, Mala, a detective by profession. They are soon to be married. The story moves forward by Mala finding out that G.D., who runs a gym where he trains boxers and only wants his trainee to win the boxing championship, he commits many crimes and she seeks evidence, so he can be jailed.

The story takes a turn when Janki gets a call from mental hospital that Ganga has completely recovered and can be discharged from the hospital. She shares her agony with her husband and tells him that it would be impossible to give back her son to his biological mother Ganga. Overhearing this conversation, Kumar is shattered. But when Ganga meets his son for the first time, she doesn't reveal the truth to him, realising that Janki is a heart patient and would die without Kumar and soon moves to Haridwar. Kumar goes to Haridwar to find her and brings her back and provides her a house. He doesn't reveal to Janki about their association. Soon he learns that his biological father, Ajay, was a boxing champion who was killed by G.D.

Kumar decides to take revenge by winning a boxing championship against the killers and he finally succeeds. But, seeing the murder of her husband's murderers, Ganga becomes disturbed and dies on the spot. Kumar returns home and announces that Ganga is dead, but still doesn't confess that he knows the truth. The story ends with the family remembering Ganga.

Cast 
Dharmendra as Kumar Agnihotri "Bittu"
Reena Roy as Mala Bajpai
Shreeram Lagoo as Madan Agnihotri
Nirupa Roy as Janki Agnihotri
Amrish Puri as Govardhan Das "G.D."
Dara Singh as Ajay
Sharada as Ganga
Asrani as Premi
Bob Christo as Anthony
Sharat Saxena as Boxer Tiger Azaad
Yusuf Khan as Boxer Gopinath

Songs

References

External links 
 

1982 films
1980s Hindi-language films
Indian boxing films
Films directed by T. Rama Rao
Films scored by Laxmikant–Pyarelal
Hindi remakes of Kannada films
Sports action films